Tima Kurdi (born 1970) is a Syrian-Canadian author and human rights activist. Born in Damascus, she moved to Canada as a young adult and is based in Coquitlam, British Columbia. Kurdi is the author of The Boy on the Beach, which documents the circumstances that led to the death of her nephews Ghalib and Alan Kurdi, and their mother, Rehanna as the fled the Syria civil war.

Early life and education 
Kurdi was born in 1970 and grew up in a Kurdish family in Damascus, Syria. She emigrated to Canada in 1992, at the age of 22 years.

Adult life 

Kurdi is the founder of The Kurdi Foundation, through which she advocates for Canadians to be mindful of the needs of refugees. In 2018, she advocated for Canada to accept more refugees.

Her memoir The Boy on the Beach documents her own family's efforts to escape the Syrian civil war and the circumstances that led to the deaths of Alan and Ghalib Kurdi (her nephews) and Rehanna (her sister in law), in 2015. In 2019, she expressed her distress that a movie about Alan's death was being made without the Kurdi family's consent by filmmaker Omer Sarikaya.

Kurdi lives in Coquitlam, British Columbia, Canada.

References

External links 

 Kurdi Foundation official website

1970 births
Living people
Syrian emigrants to Canada
21st-century Syrian writers
21st-century Syrian women writers
Women founders
Organization founders
Writers from Damascus
Writers from British Columbia
People from Coquitlam
21st-century Kurdish writers
Kurdish activists
Kurdish women activists
Kurdish writers
Kurdish women writers
Canadian autobiographers
Syrian human rights activists
Syrian women activists
Syrian women writers
Canadian human rights activists
Canadian women activists
21st-century Canadian non-fiction writers
21st-century Canadian women writers
Canadian women non-fiction writers